Paul Miller Busby (August 25, 1918 – December 5, 2003), nicknamed "Red", was a Major League Baseball outfielder who played for the Philadelphia Phillies (1941 and 1943). He was born in Waynesboro, Mississippi.

Busby made his major league debut on September 14, 1941 in a road game against the Pittsburgh Pirates at Forbes Field.  His last appearance (July 1, 1943) was in a home doubleheader against the Pirates at Shibe Park. 

Busby appeared in the outfield 13 times in his 36 games.  While in the field he recorded 28 putouts without making an error. He went 15-for-56 at the plate (.268) with 7 RBI and 16 runs scored.

External links

Retrosheet

1918 births
2003 deaths
People from Waynesboro, Mississippi
Major League Baseball outfielders
Baseball players from Mississippi
Philadelphia Phillies players
Major League Baseball right fielders
Ole Miss Rebels baseball players
Mayodan Millers players
Martinsville Manufacturers players
Spartanburg Spartans players
Memphis Chickasaws players
Knoxville Smokies players